Karl-Gustaf Jernström established Sirkus Finlandia in 1976.The first show of Circus Finlandia was performed 21 April 1976 in Ekenäs, Finland. Today Circus Finlandia is the only Finnish circus of international standards. It is also a member of European Circus Association. About 200 000 Finns attend Circus Finlandia's show each year.

Karl-Gustav Jernström and his spouse Leena Jurvakainen have four children of which three are working with the family circus: Maria, Anna, Heidi and Carl Johan . They have also four grandchildren (Maria's, Anna's and Heidi's children): Anita, Aleksia, Katerina and Charlie.

In addition to performers the circus employs about 45 people. The number of performers and band together is about 35 people.

The director of Sirkus Finlandia is now Carl Johan Jernström (Calle Jr Jernström), the son of Karl-Gustav Jernström.

External links
 http://sirkusfinlandia.fi/

Circuses
Finnish culture